Ben Avi Albert Altit (born April 4, 1993) is an Israeli basketball player for Hapoel Be'er Sheva of the Israeli Premier League. He played college basketball for Bryant University before playing professionally in Israel.

Early years
Altit was born in Herzliya, Israel, He played for Maccabi Tel Aviv youth team. Altit played college basketball for Bryant University in Smithfield, Rhode Island, In 30 games played during the 2011–12 season, he averaged 4.9 points, 2.6 rebounds and 1.2 blocks per game.

Professional career
Altit started his professional career with Bnei Herzliya in the 2012–13 season, averaging 4.9 points and 1.4 rebounds in 14 Israeli League games.

For the 2013–14, Altit signed with Euroleague squad Maccabi Tel Aviv. He was part of the roster that won the 2013–14 Euroleague. In the 2014–15 season, he was loaned to Ironi Ramat Gan.

In the 2015 offseason, Altit signed with Israeli Premier League newcomer Maccabi Kiryat Gat.

On August 1, 2016, Altit signed with Maccabi Ashdod for the 2016–17 season.

On July 17, 2017, Altit signed with Hapoel Gilboa Galil for the 2017–18 season. On December 4, 2017, Altit recorded a career-high 19 points, shooting 8-of-11 from the field, along with five rebounds in a 99–74 win over Bnei Herzliya. Altit helped Gilboa Galil reach the 2018 Israeli League Playoffs, where they eventually lost to Hapoel Jerusalem.

On July 24, 2018, Altit signed a one-year contract extension with Gilboa Galil. However, on January 21, 2019, Altit parted ways with Gilboa Galil to join Ironi Nahariya for the rest of the season.

On July 25, 2019, Altit signed a one-year deal with Maccabi Rishon LeZion. However, on August 25, 2019, Altit parted ways with Rishon LeZion due to a foot injury. On September 25, 2019, Altit signed with Hapoel Be'er Sheva for the 2019–20 season.

On 2021, Altit participated in the 4th season of The X Factor Israel, as well as his brother Nimrod, in the goal of representing Israel in the Eurovision Song Contest 2022, however, neither of them passed the auditions.

National team career
Altit is a member of the Israeli national basketball team. On November 24, 2017, He made his first appearance for the senior team at the 2019 FIBA Basketball World Cup qualification match against Estonia.

Altit was also a member of the Israeli Under-18  and Under-20 national teams. He also participated at the 2017 Summer Universiade.

References

External links
 Bryant bio
 RealGM profile
 Basket.co.il profile

1993 births
Living people
Bnei Hertzeliya basketball players
Bryant Bulldogs men's basketball players
Centers (basketball)
Hapoel Be'er Sheva B.C. players
Hapoel Gilboa Galil Elyon players
Ironi Nahariya players
Ironi Ramat Gan players
Israeli expatriate basketball people in the United States
Israeli men's basketball players
Maccabi Ashdod B.C. players
Maccabi Kiryat Gat B.C. players
Maccabi Tel Aviv B.C. players
Sportspeople from Herzliya
The X Factor contestants